, also Utsuro-fune, and Urobune, was an unknown object that allegedly washed ashore in 1803 in Hitachi province on the eastern coast of Japan. When defining Utsuro-bune, the bune part means "boat" while Utsuro means empty, or hollow. Accounts of the tale appear in three texts: Toen shōsetsu (1825), Hyōryū kishū (1835) and Ume-no-chiri (1844).

According to legend, an attractive young woman aged 18–20 years old, arrived on a local beach aboard the "hollow ship" on February 22, 1803. Fishermen brought her inland to investigate further, but the woman was unable to communicate in Japanese. She was very different from anyone else there. The fishermen then returned her and her vessel to the sea, where it drifted away.

Historians, ethnologists and physicists such as Kazuo Tanaka and Yanagita Kunio have evaluated the "legend of the hollow boat" as part of a long-standing tradition within Japanese folklore. Alternatively, certain ufologists have claimed that the story represents evidence for a close encounter with extraterrestrial life.

Historical sources 
The best-known versions of the legend are found in three texts:
 , composed in 1825 by Kyokutei Bakin. The manuscript is today on display at the Mukyū-Kai-Toshokan at Machida (Tokyo prefecture).
 , composed during the Edo period in 1835 by an unknown author. It is today on display at the library of the Tenri University at Tenri in the Nara prefecture.
 , composed in 1844 by Nagahashi Matajirō. It is today on display at the private library Iwase-Bunko-Toshokan (岩瀬文庫図書館) at Nara.

Description in all three books bear similarity, thus they seem to have the same historical origins. The book Toen shōsetsu contains the most detailed version.

Legend

Toen shōsetsu 
On February 22, 1803, local fishers of the  shore in the Hitachi province saw an ominous "ship" drifting in the waters. Curious, they towed the vessel back to land, discovering that it was 3.30 metres (10.83 feet) high and 5.45 metres (17.88 feet) wide, its shape reminding the witnesses of a Kōhako (Japanese incense burner). Its upper part appeared to be made of red coated rosewood, while the lower part was covered with brazen plates, obviously to protect it against the sharp-edged rocks.

The upper part had several windows made of glass or crystal, covered with bars and clogged with some kind of tree resin. The shape of the hollow boat resembled a wooden rice pit. The windows were completely transparent and the baffled fishermen looked inside. The inner side of the Utsuro-bune was decorated with texts written in an unknown language. The fishermen found items inside such as two bed sheets, a bottle filled with 3.6 litres of water, some cake and kneaded meat.

Then the fishermen saw a beautiful young woman, possibly 18 or 20 years old. Her body size was said to be 1.5 metres (4.92 feet). The woman had red hair and eyebrows, the hair elongated by artificial white extensions. The extensions could have been made of white fur or thin, white-powdered textile streaks. This hairstyle cannot be found in any literature. The skin of the lady was a very pale pink color. She wore precious, long and smooth clothes of unknown fabrics.

The woman began speaking, but no one understood her. She did not seem to understand the fishermen either, so no one could ask her about her origin. Although the mysterious woman appeared friendly and courteous, she acted oddly, for she always clutched a quadratic box made of pale material and around 0.6 m (24 in) in size. The woman did not allow anyone to touch the box, no matter how kindly or pressingly the witnesses asked.

An old man from the village theorised, "This woman could be a princess of a foreign realm, who married at her homeland. But when she had an affair with a townsman after marriage, it caused a scandal and the lover was killed for punishment. The princess was banned from home, for she enjoyed lots of sympathy, so she escaped the death penalty. Instead, she might have been exposed in that Utsuro-bune to leave her to destiny. If this should be correct, the quadratic box may contain the head of the woman's deceased lover. In the past, a very similar object with a woman was washed ashore on a close-by beach.

During this incident, a small board with a pinned head was found. The content of the box could therefore be the same, which would certainly explain why she protects it so much. It would cost lots of money and time to investigate the woman and her boat. Since it seems to be tradition to expose those boats at sea, we should bring the woman back to the Utsuro-bune and let her drift away. The townspeople were frightened. In a different version, the lady from the hollow boat stays where she landed and grows to old age. From human sight it might be cruel, but it seems to be her predetermined destiny." The fishermen reassembled the Utsuro-bune, placed the woman in it, and set it to drift away into the ocean.

Ume no chiri 
It reminded the witnesses of a rice cooking pot, around its middle it had a thickened rim. It was also coated with black paint and it had four little windows on four sides. The windows had bars and they were clogged with tree resin. The lower part of the boat was protected by brazen plates which looked to be made of iron of the highest western quality. The height of the boat was 3.33 m (10.83 ft) and its breadth was 5.41 m (17.75 ft).

A woman of 20 years was found in the boat. Her body size was 1.5 m (4.92 ft) and her skin was as white as snow. The long hair dangled smoothly down along her back. Her face was of indescribable beauty. The dress of the woman was of unknown style and no one could recognise it. She spoke an unknown language. She held a small box no one was allowed to touch. Inside the boat two unusually soft carpets of unknown style and fabric were found. There were supplies such as cake, kneaded food and meat. A beautifully decorated cup with ornaments no one could identify was also found.

Similar traditions 
The investigation started in 1844, and continued in 1925, and 1962. In 2010 and 2012 two rare ink printings were found and investigated by Kazuo Tanaka. In 1977 they contained stories about Utsuro-bune with very similar content to that of the Hyōryū kishū, although they claim a different location for the events:  (harbour of Bōshū).

Other legends concerning Utsuro-bune 
A well known Japanese legend is that of the origin of the Kōno clan of the Iyo Province. In the 7th century, a fisherman named  from Gogo island found a 13-year-old girl inside an Utsuro-bune drifting at sea. He brought her to land, where she told him that she was the daughter of the Chinese emperor and that she had been forced to flee to escape her stepmother. The fisherman named her  ("princess Wake") and raised her, before she married an imperial prince of Iyo province and gave birth to a son named , the ancestor of the Kōno clan. A part of this folktale held that she was responsible for bringing the first silk cocoons to Japan. Princess Wake is still worshiped at the Funakoshi Wakehime Shinto shrine in the village of Funakoshi on Gogo island.

Interpretations

Historical investigations 
The first historical investigations of the Utsuro-bune incident were conducted in 1844 by Kyokutei Bakin (1767–1848). Kyokutei reports about a book called , written by Kanamori Kinken. The book describes traditional Russian clothes and hairstyles and mentions a popular method to dust hair with white powder. It also mentions that many Russian women have natural red hair and that they wear skirts, similar to that of the lady of the legend.

Based upon the book, Kyokutei suggests that the woman of the Utsuro-bune incident could have been of Russian origin. He writes that the stories are similar to each other, as they differ only in minor descriptions (for example, one documents says "3.6 litres of water", another says "36 litres of water"). He also questions the origin of the alleged exotic symbols found in and on the boat. Because he is convinced that he saw similar signs on a British whaler stranded shortly before his writing, Kyokutei wonders if the woman was a Russian, British or even American princess. Furthermore, he expresses his disappointment about the drawings of the Utsuro-bune, because they obviously do not fully match the witness descriptions.

Modern investigations 
Further investigations of the Utsuro-bune incident were done in 1925 and in 1962 by ethnologist and historian Yanagida Kunio. He points out that circular boats were never anything unusual in Japan since early times; only the western-like details, such as the windows made of glass and the brazen protective plates, make the Utsuro-bune look exotic. He also found out that most legends similar to that of the Utsuro-bune sound alike: Someone finds a strange girl or young woman inside a circular boat and rescues the stranded or sends her back to the ocean.

Yanagida also points out that the eldest versions of Utsuro-bune describe humble, circular and open log-boats without any dome atop. Yanagida assumes that the details of the brazen plates and windows made of glass or crystal were added because skeptics would question the seaworthiness of a humble log-boat on the high seas. A steel reinforced Utsuro-bune with glass windows would more easily survive travelling on the ocean than an open, unreinforced wooden boat.

Dr. Kazuo Tanaka (田中 嘉津夫), Japanese professor for computer and electronics engineering from Gifu University at Tokyo (東京), investigated the original scripts in 1997. He considers the popular comparisons of the Utsuro-bune with modern UFO sightings to be far-fetched. He points out that the Utsuro-bune of the legends never flies or moves on its own, nor does it show any signs of extraordinary technologies. It simply drifts motionless on the water. Tanaka concludes that the tale of the Utsuro-bune was a literary mixture of folklore and imaginations. He bases his assumptions on the 1925 investigations of the Japanese historian Yanagida Kunio, who had also studied the tales of the Utsuro-bune.

Dr. Tanaka himself found out that the locations "Haratono-hama" and "Harayadori" are fictitious. To make the anecdote sound credible, the author designated the beaches as personal acreages of a Daimyō named Ogasawara Nagashige. This daimyō actually lived during the Edo period, but his acreages were placed at heartland and it seems sure that Ogasawara never had any contact with the fishermen of the Pacific coast. The Ogasawara clan served the famous Tokugawa clan, who held power over the most north-eastern part of Japan until 1868 and their main acreages were placed in the Hitashi province, geographically very close to the eastern beaches.

Tanaka finds it very odd that no incident of such alleged importance was commented on in the curatorial documents, since strangers leaving the shore had to be reported at once. But the only remarkable incident during the late Tokugawa clan happened in 1824, when a British whaler was stranded at the north-eastern coast of the Hitachi district. Tanaka also found out that, during the rulership of the Tokugawa clan, the Ogasawara family and the Tokugawa started mapping their territories and acreages. And both names of "Haratono-hama" and "Harayadori" are missing. They also do not appear on the maps of the first complete mappings of the whole of Japan in 1907. If the name of a village, city or place had changed in history, this would have been noted in some curatorial documents, but it is not. Tanaka thinks it rather unlikely that important places such as "Haratono-hama" and "Harayadori" actually could have been forgotten in records.

The peculiar European appearance of the woman, the upper part of the Utsuro-bune and the unknown writings lead Tanaka and Yanagida to the conclusion that the whole story was based on the historical circumstance that people of the Edo period totally encapsulated Japan against the outer world. To bedizen a stranded woman with European attributes showed how much the peoples were afraid of bad cultural influences from the western world, especially North America and Great Britain. The story of the Utsuro-bune is significantly constructed in a way that makes the tale sound incredible at one site, but self-explaining at the same time (the woman and her craft are sent away so no one could ever consult her personally).

Furthermore, Tanaka and Yanagida point out that the people of Edo period shared great interests in paranormal things such as yūrei, onibi, hitodama and yōkai, so it would not be surprising to find stories of exotic boats like the Utsuro-bune.

In his conclusions, Tanaka points to the difficulty in the correct reading of the place names. In modern transcriptions, the Kanji 原舎 have to be read as Harasha. But in Toen Shōsetsu the signs are written in Kana and they have to be read as Hara-yadori. In Ume no chiri they are written in Furigana making the place to be named as Haratono-hama. Alternatively, the kanji for Haratono could be read as Hara-yadori. According to Tanaka’s investigations, the transcription of 原舎ヶ浜 in the Hyōryū Kishū as "Harasha-ga-hama" is therefore a typo based on a misreading and should originally be read as "Haratono-ga-hama". Thus, all writings describe the same place.

Tanaka also points out that the word Utsuro means "empty" or "abandoned" and that the word Utsubo means "quiver" and describes the bags in which hunters and archers once carried their arrows. But both words also describe old, hollowed tree trunks and branch holes of sacred trees. The word Fune/Bune simply means "boat". Altogether, the word Utsuro-bune means "hollow ship".

On May 26, 2014,  reported Tanaka found Jinichi Kawakami's  regarding  and place name (as of 2014) where coast surveyed in 1801 and on Dai Nihon Enkai Yochi Zenzu (:ja:大日本沿海輿地全図 maps of Japan's coastal area) by Inō Tadataka.

Ufological 
In ufology, the legend of the Utsuro-bune has been described as an early case of a documented close encounter of the third kind based on the similarities between the drawings of the vessel from the Edo period and 20th century descriptions of flying saucers. Some ufologists suggest the Utsuro-bune could have been an unidentified submerged object (USO). They note the mysterious symbols which were reportedly found on the object that regularly appear as addenda within the depictions.

They are suggested by some to be similar to the symbols reported from the Rendlesham Forest Incident in England. Drawings of odd figures and unknown symbols have also been found in caves. UFO proponents further point to the woman's box, her physical appearance and unusual dress as evidence of  extraterrestrial origin. What historians and ethnologists have said about those items is repeatedly ignored.

Utsuro-bune in manga and anime 
Utsuro-bune are popular motifs in manga and anime. A prominent example appears in the television series Mononoke (2007), which revolves around the tales told by a traveller known as the "medicine seller" (薬売り). In episodes 3–5, the protagonist tells the story of Umibōzu, in which a sunken Utsuro-bune features prominently. Here it is depicted as a decorated, sealed, hollow tree trunk, and contains the corpse of a young woman who had been sacrificed to sea demons.

In the third season of Mysterious Cities of Gold, an Utsuro-bune coming from the sunken third City has ended up in the forest near Kagoshima. When activated, it reveals a water-like hologram of a woman that tells the protagonists of the next key item to find.

The episode 17 of the anime series Vampire Princess Miyu, titled The Moray Boat, is based on this legend.

References

External links 
 Colorated illustrations of the Utsuro-bune, the woman and the unreadable glyphs in Hyōryū-ki-shū (Japanese)
 Further depictions and informations around the Utsuro-bune (Japanese)
 Popular scientific website about the Utsuro-bune (English)

1803 in Japan
Forteana
Unidentified flying objects